Ursidibacter maritimus is a bacterium from the genus of Ursidibacter which has been isolated from the oral cavity of a polar bear from Greenland.

References

Pasteurellales
Bacteria described in 2015